Nigel Eccles is a technology entrepreneur currently serving as the CEO of the group chat company Flick. He is best known for being the co-founder and CEO of Hubdub and FanDuel.

Career
Nigel launched the online political prediction market Hubdub in 2007. He admitted that Hubdub "didn’t really have a good business model," which made him change the focus of the company. Hubdub later turned into FanDuel.

Eccles co-founded the daily fantasy company FanDuel in 2009. Starting in 2016, he oversaw the planning of the merger between FanDuel and Draftkings. However, the Federal Trade Commission blocked the merger from taking place in 2017.

In November 2017 Eccles left FanDuel to pursue a new venture in the esports industry.

In January 2018, Eccles co-founded an Edinburgh-based video game and social streaming platform Flick.

In May of 2020, Nigel Eccles worked with Scott Greenberg and Mike Kuchera to create StarStock, a website focused on buying and selling sports cards. In March of 2021, StarStock raised $8 million in a round of funding, with investors including Andreesen Horowitz and Atlanta Hawks guard Trae Young.

References 

Year of birth missing (living people)
Living people